The following notable lakes are completely or partially within the borders of the State of Palestine:
Dead Sea
Marj Sanur (seasonal lake)

See also
 

State of Palestine
Lakes